The black pitohui (Melanorectes nigrescens) is a species of bird in the monotypic genus of Melanorectes in the family Pachycephalidae.
It is found throughout the highlands of New Guinea.
Its natural habitat is subtropical or tropical moist lowland forests.

Taxonomy and systematics
The black pitohui was originally described in the genus Rectes (a synonym for the genus Pitohui) and re-classified to Melanorectes in 2013. Alternate names include black whistler and dusky pitohui.

Subspecies 
The following six subspecies are recognized:
 M. n. nigrescens – (Schlegel, 1871): Found in northwestern New Guinea
 M. n. wandamensis – (Hartert, 1930): Found in Wandammen Peninsula (western New Guinea)
 M. n. meeki – (Rothschild & Hartert, 1913): Originally described as a separate species in the genus Pitohui. Found in west-central New Guinea
 M. n. buergersi – (Stresemann, 1922): Found in northern and east-central New Guinea
 M. n. harterti – Reichenow, 1911: Originally described as a separate species. Found in northeastern New Guinea
 M. n. schistaceus – (Reichenow, 1900): Found in southeastern New Guinea

References

black pitohui
black pitohui
Birds of New Guinea
Taxa named by Hermann Schlegel
black pitohui
Taxonomy articles created by Polbot